Feeder may refer to:

Technology
 Feeder (livestock equipment)
 Feeder (beekeeping), any of several devices used in apiculture to supplement or replace natural food sources
 Feeder (casting), another name for a riser, a reservoir built into a metal casting mold to prevent cavities due to shrinkage
 Feeder cells, are cells that line a Petri dish to provide cell contact for cells or tissues that grow on top of the feeder cells
 Feeder, frontage road, or other small road eventually delivering traffic to a larger one
 Feeder line (disambiguation), a peripheral route or branch from a main line or trunk line
 Aquarium fish feeder, an electric or electronic device that is designed to feed aquarium fish at regular intervals
 Automatic document feeder, in office equipment
 Bird feeder
 Bowl feeder, used to feed components automation applications
 Bulk feeder
 Leaky feeder, a communications system used in underground mining and other tunnel environments
 Rotary feeder, a component in a bulk or specialty material handling system
 Variable rate feeder, a piece of industrial control equipment used to deliver solid material at a known rate into some process
 Vibrating feeder, an instrument that uses vibration to feed material to a process or machine
 In video game terminology, a character who dies repeatedly

People
Livestock feeder (person), a farmer rearing and fattening livestock

Vehicles
 Feeder bus, bus service that brings people from a rail station or transit hub to their final destination or vice versa 
 Feeder ship, a small-to-medium container ship which collects and distributes containers between ports and hubs

Electrical
 In electric power distribution, voltage power line transferring power from a distribution substation to the distribution transformers
 An electrical wiring circuit in a building which carries power from a transformer or switch gear to a distribution panel
 A circuit conductor between the power supply source and a final branch circuit over current device
 Feeder link, a radio link from an earth station at a given location to a space station (up-link), or vice versa (down-link)

Entertainment
 Feeder (band), a Welsh rock group
 Feeders (film), a 1996 low-budget horror film by the Polonia brothers
 "The Feeder", filmed as Behind the Make-Up (1930) Mildred Cram

Organisms
 Feeder cattle
 Feeder cell, a fibroblast, a type of cell used in human embryonic stem cell research
 Feeder fish, certain types of inexpensive fish commonly fed as live prey to captive animals
 Fluid feeder (disambiguation), organisms that feed on the fluid of other organisms
 Deposit feeder, organisms that obtain nutrients by consuming dissolved organic matter
 Live food

Other
 Feeder, a software application for creating, editing and publishing RSS feeds on Mac OS X
 Feeder (fetish), someone who gains sexual pleasure from helping another gain weight
 Feeder Airlines
 Feeder band, a band of squall-like winds and rain on the outside of a tropical cyclone
 Feeder barn
 Feeder bluff, in geography
 Feeder club, another name for a farm team
 Feeder formula, in formula racing
 Feeder fund, an investment fund which does almost all of its investments through a master fund via a master-feeder relationship
 Feeder school

See also
 
 
 Feed (disambiguation)